Harry Walker (11 February 1915 – 5 June 2018) was an English rugby union player and was the oldest living former England international player until his death. He made his international debut on 18 January 1947 against  at Twickenham. His last international was against  in 1948.

He initially played as a flanker for Coventry before switching to prop. Walker celebrated his 103rd birthday with former players at a Coventry rugby club dinner held in his honour.

References 

1915 births
2018 deaths
English rugby union players
Coventry R.F.C. players
England international rugby union players
English centenarians
Men centenarians
Rugby union props
Rugby union flankers